Caraway is a plant in the family Apiaceae whose seeds are used as a spice.

Caraway may also refer to:

 Black caraway

Places
 Caraway, Arkansas, United States
 Caraway Mountains, North Carolina, United States
 Caraway Speedway, an automobile racetrack near Asheboro, North Carolina
 Caraway Conference Center and Camp, camp and retreat center owned and operated by the Baptist State Convention of North Carolina

People 
 Barbara Mallory Caraway (born 1956), Texas state representative
 Bryan Caraway (born 1984), American mixed martial artist
 Dwaine Caraway, mayor of Dallas, Texas
 Elbert Caraway, American football and baseball player and coach
 Hattie Caraway (1878–1950), United States senator from Arkansas
 Nancie Caraway (born 1942), first lady of Hawaii
 Pat Caraway (1905–1974), Major League Baseball player
 Paul Caraway (1905–1985), United States Army lieutenant general
 Thaddeus H. Caraway (1871–1931), United States representative and senator from Arkansas